Rafael Ribeiro (born 23 June 1986) is a retired Brazilian sprinter.

References

1986 births
Living people
Brazilian male sprinters
Place of birth missing (living people)
Pan American Games gold medalists for Brazil
Pan American Games medalists in athletics (track and field)
Athletes (track and field) at the 2007 Pan American Games
Medalists at the 2007 Pan American Games
21st-century Brazilian people